Ragan v. Merchants Transfer & Warehouse Co., 337 U.S. 530 (1949), is a United States Supreme Court case in which the Court held that federal courts sitting in diversity should begin the running of the statute of limitations for a claim according to state law instead of according to the federal rules of civil procedure.  The court reasoned that a claim could not be given longer life in federal court than it would have had in a state court while being consistent with the holding in Erie Railroad v. Tompkins.

References

External links 
 

United States Supreme Court cases
United States Supreme Court cases of the Vinson Court
Conflict of laws case law
Diversity jurisdiction case law
1949 in United States case law